Below is a chronological listing of the United States senators from Idaho. The state was admitted to the Union on July 3, 1890, and its U.S. senators belong to Class 2 and Class 3. Idaho's current senators are Republicans Mike Crapo and Jim Risch. William Borah was Idaho's longest-serving senator (1907–1940).

List of senators

|- style="height:2em"
| colspan=3 | Vacant
| nowrap | Jul 3, 1890 – Dec 18, 1890
| After joining the Union, Idaho did not elect its senators for six months.	
| rowspan=4 | 1
| rowspan=2 
| rowspan=2 | 1
| After joining the Union, Idaho did not elect its senators for six months.	
| nowrap | Jul 3, 1890 – Dec 18, 1890
| colspan=3 | Vacant

|- style="height:2em"
! rowspan=6 | 1
| rowspan=6 align=left | George Shoup
| rowspan=6  | Republican
| rowspan=6 nowrap | Dec 18, 1890 –Mar 3, 1901
| rowspan=3 | Elected in 1890.
| Elected in 1890.Retired.
| nowrap | Dec 18, 1890 –Mar 3, 1891
|  | Republican
| align=right | William McConnell
! 1

|- style="height:2em"
| 
| rowspan=3 | 2
| rowspan=3 | Elected in 1890.Lost re-election as a Silver Republican.
| rowspan=3 nowrap | Mar 4, 1891 –Mar 3, 1897
| rowspan=3  | Republican
| rowspan=3 align=right | Fred Dubois
! rowspan=3 | 2

|- style="height:2em"
| 

|- style="height:2em"
| rowspan=3 | Re-elected in 1895.Lost re-election.
| rowspan=3 | 2
| 

|- style="height:2em"
| 
| rowspan=4 | 3
| rowspan=4 | Elected in 1897.Retired.
| rowspan=4 nowrap | Mar 4, 1897 –Mar 3, 1903
| rowspan=4  | Populist
| rowspan=4 align=right | Henry Heitfeld
! rowspan=4 | 3

|- style="height:2em"
| 

|- style="height:2em"
! rowspan=4 | 2
| rowspan=4 align=left | Fred Dubois
|  | Silver Republican
| rowspan=4 nowrap | Mar 4, 1901 –Mar 3, 1907
| rowspan=4 | Elected in 1901 as a Silver Republican, but changed party to Democratic.Lost re-election.
| rowspan=4 | 3
| rowspan=2 

|- style="height:2em"
| rowspan=3  | Democratic

|- style="height:2em"
| 
| rowspan=3 | 4
| rowspan=3 | Elected in 1903.
| rowspan=5 nowrap | Mar 4, 1903 –Oct 17, 1912
| rowspan=5  | Republican
| rowspan=5 align=right | Weldon Heyburn
! rowspan=5 | 4

|- style="height:2em"
| 

|- style="height:2em"
! rowspan=25 | 3
| rowspan=25 align=left | William Borah
| rowspan=25  | Republican
| rowspan=25 nowrap | Mar 4, 1907 –Jan 19, 1940
| rowspan=6 | Elected in 1907.
| rowspan=6 | 4
| 

|- style="height:2em"
| 
| rowspan=6 | 5
| rowspan=2 | Re-elected in 1909.Died.

|- style="height:2em"
| rowspan=4 

|- style="height:2em"
|  
| nowrap | Oct 17, 1912 –Nov 18, 1912
| colspan=3 | Vacant

|- style="height:2em"
| Appointed to continue Heyburn's term.Lost election to finish Heyburn's term.
| nowrap | Nov 18, 1912 –Feb 6, 1913
|  | Democratic
| align=right | Kirtland Perky
! 5

|- style="height:2em"
| rowspan=2 | Elected in 1913 to finish Heyburn's term.
| rowspan=4 nowrap | Feb 6, 1913 –Jan 13, 1918
| rowspan=4  | Republican
| rowspan=4 align=right | James Brady
! rowspan=4 | 6

|- style="height:2em"
| rowspan=5 | Re-elected in 1913.
| rowspan=5 | 5
| 

|- style="height:2em"
| 
| rowspan=6 | 6
| rowspan=2 | Re-elected in 1914.Died.

|- style="height:2em"
| rowspan=3 

|- style="height:2em"
|  
| nowrap | Jan 13, 1918 –Jan 22, 1918
| colspan=3 | Vacant

|- style="height:2em"
| rowspan=2 | Appointed to continue Brady's term.Elected in 1918 to finish Brady's term.Resigned to become a Federal Trade Commissioner, having lost election to a full term.
| rowspan=2 nowrap | Jan 22, 1918 –Jan 14, 1921
| rowspan=2  | Democratic
| rowspan=2 align=right | John Nugent
! rowspan=2 | 7

|- style="height:2em"
| rowspan=4 | Re-elected in 1918
| rowspan=4 | 6
| rowspan=2 

|- style="height:2em"
| Appointed to finish Nugent's term, having been elected to the next term.
| rowspan=5 nowrap | Jan 15, 1921 –Jun 24, 1928
| rowspan=5  | Republican
| rowspan=5 align=right | Frank Gooding
! rowspan=5 | 8

|- style="height:2em"
| 
| rowspan=3 | 7
| rowspan=3 | Elected to full term in 1920.

|- style="height:2em"
| 

|- style="height:2em"
| rowspan=5 | Re-elected in 1924.
| rowspan=5 | 7
| 

|- style="height:2em"
| rowspan=3 
| rowspan=5 | 8
| Re-elected in 1926.Died.

|- style="height:2em"
|  
| nowrap | Jun 24, 1928 –Jun 30, 1928
| colspan=3 | Vacant

|- style="height:2em"
| rowspan=3 | Appointed to continue Gooding's term.Elected in 1928 to finish Gooding's term.Lost re-election.
| rowspan=3 nowrap | Jun 30, 1928 –Mar 3, 1933
| rowspan=3  | Republican
| rowspan=3 align=right | John W. Thomas
! rowspan=3 | 9

|- style="height:2em"
| 

|- style="height:2em"
| rowspan=3 | Re-elected in 1930.
| rowspan=3 | 8
| 

|- style="height:2em"
| 
| rowspan=3 | 9
| rowspan=3 | Elected in 1932.Lost renomination.
| rowspan=3 nowrap | Mar 4, 1933 –Jan 3, 1939
| rowspan=3  | Democratic
| rowspan=3 align=right | James Pope
! rowspan=3 | 10

|- style="height:2em"
| 

|- style="height:2em"
| rowspan=2 | Re-elected in 1936.Died.
| rowspan=5 | 9
| 

|- style="height:2em"
| rowspan=3 
| rowspan=5 | 10
| rowspan=5 | Elected in 1938.Lost renomination.
| rowspan=5 nowrap | Jan 3, 1939 –Jan 3, 1945
| rowspan=5  | Democratic
| rowspan=5 align=right | D. Worth Clark
! rowspan=5 | 11

|- style="height:2em"
| colspan=3 | Vacant
| nowrap | Jan 19, 1940 –Jan 27, 1940
|  

|- style="height:2em"
! rowspan=4 | 4
| rowspan=4 align=left | John W. Thomas
| rowspan=4  | Republican
| rowspan=4 | Jan 27, 1940 –Nov 10, 1945
| rowspan=2 | Appointed to continue Borah's term.Elected in 1940 to finish Borah's term.

|- style="height:2em"
| 

|- style="height:2em"
| rowspan=2 | Re-elected in 1942.Died.
| rowspan=6 | 10
| 

|- style="height:2em"
| rowspan=4 
| rowspan=8 | 11
| rowspan=8 | Elected in 1944.Lost renomination.
| rowspan=8 nowrap | Jan 3, 1945 –Jan 3, 1951
| rowspan=8  | Democratic
| rowspan=8 align=right | Glen H. Taylor
! rowspan=8 | 12

|- style="height:2em"
| colspan=3 | Vacant
| nowrap | Nov 10, 1945 –Nov 17, 1945
|  

|- style="height:2em"
! 5
| align=left | Charles C. Gossett
|  | Democratic
| nowrap | Nov 17, 1945 –Nov 5, 1946
| Appointed to continue Thomas's term.Lost nomination to finish Thomas's term.

|- style="height:2em"
! rowspan=2 | 6
| rowspan=2 align=left | Henry Dworshak
| rowspan=2  | Republican
| rowspan=2 nowrap | Nov 6, 1946 –Jan 3, 1949
| rowspan=2 | Elected in 1946 to finish Thomas's term.Lost re-election.

|- style="height:2em"
| 

|- style="height:2em"
! 7
| align=left | Bert H. Miller
|  | Democratic
| nowrap | Jan 3, 1949 –Oct 8, 1949
| Elected in 1948.Died.
| rowspan=5 | 11
| rowspan=3 

|- style="height:2em"
| colspan=3 | Vacant
| nowrap | Oct 8, 1949 –Oct 14, 1949
|  

|- style="height:2em"
! rowspan=7 | 8
| rowspan=7 align=left | Henry Dworshak
| rowspan=7  | Republican
| rowspan=7 nowrap | Oct 14, 1949 –Jul 23, 1962
| rowspan=3 | Appointed to continue Miller's term.Elected in 1950 to finish Miller's term.

|- style="height:2em"
| 
| rowspan=3 | 12
| rowspan=3 | Elected in 1950.Lost re-election.
| rowspan=3 nowrap | Jan 3, 1951 –Jan 3, 1957
| rowspan=3  | Republican
| rowspan=3 align=right | Herman Welker
! rowspan=3 | 13

|- style="height:2em"
| 

|- style="height:2em"
| rowspan=3 | Re-elected in 1954
| rowspan=3 | 12
| 

|- style="height:2em"
| 
| rowspan=5 | 13
| rowspan=5 | Elected in 1956.
| rowspan=14 nowrap | Jan 3, 1957 –Jan 3, 1981
| rowspan=14  | Democratic
| rowspan=14 align=right | Frank Church
! rowspan=14 | 14

|- style="height:2em"
| 

|- style="height:2em"
| Re-elected in 1960.Died.
| rowspan=5 | 13
| rowspan=3 

|- style="height:2em"
| colspan=3 | Vacant
| nowrap | Jul 23, 1962 –Aug 6, 1962
|  

|- style="height:2em"
! rowspan=6 | 9
| rowspan=6 align=left | Len Jordan
| rowspan=6  | Republican
| rowspan=6 nowrap | Aug 6, 1962 –Jan 3, 1973
| rowspan=3 | Appointed to continue Dworshak's term.Elected in 1962 to finish Dworshak's term.

|- style="height:2em"
| 
| rowspan=3 | 14
| rowspan=3 | Re-elected in 1962.

|- style="height:2em"
| 

|- style="height:2em"
| rowspan=3 | Re-elected in 1966.Retired.
| rowspan=3 | 14
| 

|- style="height:2em"
| 
| rowspan=3 | 15
| rowspan=3 | Re-elected in 1968.

|- style="height:2em"
| 

|- style="height:2em"
! rowspan=9 | 10
| rowspan=9 align=left | James A. McClure
| rowspan=9  | Republican
| rowspan=9 nowrap | Jan 3, 1973 –Jan 3, 1991
| rowspan=3 | Elected in 1972.
| rowspan=3 | 15
| 

|- style="height:2em"
| 
| rowspan=3 | 16
| rowspan=3 | Re-elected in 1974.Lost re-election.

|- style="height:2em"
| 

|- style="height:2em"
| rowspan=3 | Re-elected in 1978.
| rowspan=3 | 16
| 

|- style="height:2em"
| 
| rowspan=3 | 17
| rowspan=3 | Elected in 1980.
| rowspan=6 nowrap | Jan 3, 1981 –Jan 3, 1993
| rowspan=6  | Republican
| rowspan=6 align=right | Steve Symms
! rowspan=6 | 15

|- style="height:2em"
| 

|- style="height:2em"
| rowspan=3 | Re-elected in 1984.Retired.
| rowspan=3 | 17
| 

|- style="height:2em"
| 
| rowspan=3 | 18
| rowspan=3 | Re-elected in 1986.Retired.

|- style="height:2em"
| 

|- style="height:2em"
! rowspan=9 | 11
| rowspan=9 align=left | Larry Craig
| rowspan=9  | Republican
| rowspan=9 nowrap | Jan 3, 1991 –Jan 3, 2009
| rowspan=3 | Elected in 1990.
| rowspan=3 | 18
| 

|- style="height:2em"
| 
| rowspan=3 | 19
| rowspan=3 | Elected in 1992.Retired to run for Governor of Idaho.
| rowspan=3 nowrap | Jan 3, 1993 –Jan 3, 1999
| rowspan=3  | Republican
| rowspan=3 align=right | Dirk Kempthorne
! rowspan=3 | 16

|- style="height:2em"
| 

|- style="height:2em"
| rowspan=3 | Re-elected in 1996.
| rowspan=3 | 19
| 

|- style="height:2em"
| 
| rowspan=3 | 20
| rowspan=3 | Elected in 1998.
| rowspan=15 nowrap | Jan 3, 1999 –Present
| rowspan=15  | Republican
| rowspan=15 align=right | Mike Crapo
! rowspan=15 | 17

|- style="height:2em"
| 

|- style="height:2em"
| rowspan=3 | Re-elected in 2002.Retired.
| rowspan=3 | 20
| 

|- style="height:2em"
| 
| rowspan=3 | 21
| rowspan=3 | Re-elected in 2004.

|- style="height:2em"
| 

|- style="height:2em"
! rowspan=9 | 12
| rowspan=9 align=left | Jim Risch
| rowspan=9  | Republican
| rowspan=9 nowrap | Jan 3, 2009 –Present
| rowspan=3 | Elected in 2008.
| rowspan=3 | 21
| 

|- style="height:2em"
| 
| rowspan=3 | 22
| rowspan=3 | Re-elected in 2010.

|- style="height:2em"
| 

|- style="height:2em"
| rowspan=3 | Re-elected in 2014.
| rowspan=3 | 22
| 

|- style="height:2em"
| 
| rowspan=3 | 23
| rowspan=3 | Re-elected in 2016.

|- style="height:2em"
| 

|- style="height:2em"
| rowspan=3 | Re-elected in 2020.
| rowspan=3 | 23
| 

|- style="height:2em"
| 
| rowspan=3 |24
| rowspan=3 | Re-elected in 2022.

|- style="height:2em"
| 

|- style="height:2em"
| rowspan=2 colspan=5 | To be determined in the 2026 election.
| rowspan=2 | 24
| 

|- style="height:2em"
| 
| 25
| colspan=5 | To be determined in the 2028 election.

See also

 List of United States representatives from Idaho
 United States congressional delegations from Idaho
 Elections in Idaho

Notes

References 
 
 

 
United States senators
Idaho